Ride Me may refer to:

 Ride Me (album), a 2014 album
 Ride Me (film), a 1994 film